Ryskulov is a village (selo) in the Talǵar District of Almaty Region, in south-eastern part of Kazakhstan. It is named after Soviet politician Turar Ryskulov. The KATO code is 196233800.

Demographics

Population 
Population:  (1187 males and 1200 females). As of 2009, the population of Ryskulov was 2979 inhabitants (1479 males and 1500 females).

Notable residents
 Karakat Bashanova (born 2008), runner up of the 2020 Junior Eurovision Song Contest.

References

Notes

External links
Tageo.com

Populated places in Almaty Region